The 2000 United States presidential election in Missouri took place on November 7, 2000 as part of the 2000 United States presidential election. Voters chose 11 electors to the Electoral College, who voted for president and vice president.

Missouri was a critical swing state. George W. Bush won the popular vote by a margin of just over 3% against his Democratic opponent, Al Gore. The 2000 election was seen as the turning point of Missouri's bellwether status, which the state had maintained throughout most of the 20th century, as this was the first election since 1956 that the state failed to back the popular vote winner, and only the second time since 1900. This was also the first time in history that a Democrat won the popular vote without carrying Missouri.

, this is the last time that Saline County, New Madrid County, Pemiscot County, Mississippi County, Ray County, and Clay County voted for the Democratic presidential candidate while Bush became the first Republican to win the White House without carrying St. Louis County since Rutherford Hayes in 1876.

Missouri was one of nine states won by Bush that had supported Clinton twice.

Primaries
 2000 Missouri Democratic presidential primary
 2000 Missouri Republican presidential primary

Results

By county

Counties that flipped from Democratic to Republican
Audrain (Largest city: Mexico)
Bates (Largest city: Butler)
Benton (Largest city: Warsaw)
Caldwell (Largest city: Hamilton)
Callaway (Largest city: Fulton)
Carroll (Largest city: Carrollton)
Chariton (Largest city: Salisbury)
Clark (Largest city: Kahoka)
Clinton (Largest city: Cameron)
Crawford (Largest city: Cuba)
Daviess (Largest city: Gallatin)
DeKalb (Largest city: Cameron)
Dunklin (Largest city: Kennett)
Franklin (Largest city: Washington)
Gentry (Largest city: Albany)
Grundy (Largest city: Trenton)
Henry (Largest city: Clinton)
Hickory (Largest city: Hermitage)
Howard (Largest city: Fayette)
Iron (Largest city: Ironton)
Knox (Largest city: Edina)
Lafayette (Largest city: Odessa)
Lewis (Largest city: Canton)
Lincoln (Largest city: Troy)
Linn (Largest city: Brookfield)
Livingston (Largest city: Chillicothe)
Macon (Largest city: Macon)
Madison (Largest city: Fredericktown)
Marion (Largest city: Hannibal)
Mercer (Largest city: Princeton)
Monroe (Largest city: Monroe City)
Montgomery (Largest city: Montgomery City)
Nodaway (Largest city: Maryville)
Oregon (Largest city: Thayer)
Pike (Largest city: Bowling Green)
Ralls (Largest city: Hannibal)
Randolph (Largest city: Moberly)
Reynolds (Largest city: Ellington)
Ripley (Largest city: Doniphan)
Schuyler (Largest city: Lancaster)
Scotland (Largest city: Memphis)
Scott (Largest city: Sikeston)
Shannon (Largest city: Winona)
Shelby (Largest city: Shelbina)
St. Clair (Largest city: Appleton City)
St. Francois (Largest city: Farmington)
Sullivan (Largest city: Milan)
Vernon (Largest city: Nevada)
Wayne (Largest city: Piedmont)
Worth (Largest city: Grant City)

By congressional district
Bush won 6 of 9 congressional districts, including one held by a Democrat.

Analysis

Beginning with the 2000 election, the status of the Missouri bellwether came into question. Between 1904 and 2004, Missouri was carried by the victor of each presidential election, with the exception of 1956. Though Bush won the presidency in the 2000 election through the Electoral College, he lost the national popular vote. The 2000 election was unique because this was the first time in over a century where the popular vote winner lost the general election. (In 1888, Missouri voted for Grover Cleveland, the incumbent Democrat, who lost to Republican candidate Benjamin Harrison). Thus, controversy exists as to whether or not Missouri accurately predicted the victor in this election. In the subsequent election, Missouri voted for George W. Bush, who this time won both the popular vote and the Electoral College.

In any case, Missouri has voted reliably Republican since this election. The state very narrowly voted for John McCain in 2008 and for Mitt Romney by a wider margin in 2012; both men were ultimately defeated by Barack Obama in the nationwide election. The controversy is further complicated by the 2016 presidential election, where Missouri voted for Donald Trump by a landslide, while Hillary Clinton won the popular vote by nearly three million votes, but like in 2000, Trump won the Electoral College and became 45th President of the United States. Like 2000, political scientists have differing opinions on whether or not Missouri accurately predicted the victor.

Electors

Technically the voters of Missouri cast their ballots for electors: representatives to the Electoral College. Missouri is allocated 11 electors because it has 9 congressional districts and 2 senators. All candidates who appear on the ballot or qualify to receive write-in votes must submit a list of 11 electors, who pledge to vote for their candidate and his or her running mate. Whoever wins the majority of votes in the state is awarded all 11 electoral votes. Their chosen electors then vote for president and vice president. Although electors are pledged to their candidate and running mate, they are not obligated to vote for them. An elector who votes for someone other than his or her candidate is known as a faithless elector.

The electors of each state and the District of Columbia met on December 18, 2000 to cast their votes for president and vice president. The Electoral College itself never meets as one body. Instead the electors from each state and the District of Columbia met in their respective capitols.

The following were the members of the Electoral College from the state. All were pledged to and voted for George W. Bush and Dick Cheney:
David Barklage
Bruce Bredeman
Marc Ellinger
Gordon Elliott
John Hancock
Stan Horacek
Homer Johnson
John Judd
Michael Kort
Dennis Owens
Al Rotskoff

See also
 United States presidential elections in Missouri
 Presidency of George W. Bush

References

Missouri
2000
2000 Missouri elections